Niecee Nelson was the head women's basketball coach at Fort Wayne, serving from 2016 through 2021. Nelson previously served as an assistant coach at IPFW from 2004–05. She also was an assistant coach for San Diego Toreros women's basketball and as a graduate assistant coach for Wyoming.

Nelson graduated from Concordia University in 2002 and University of Wyoming with a Master's degree in 2004. She is married to her husband Steve.

References

Purdue Fort Wayne Mastodons women's basketball coaches
Wyoming Cowgirls basketball coaches
San Diego Toreros women's basketball coaches
Concordia University (Oregon) alumni
University of Wyoming alumni
Living people
American women's basketball coaches
1979 births